Acoustic Dreams is the second extended play by indie pop band Echosmith released June 10, 2014, on LP, CD, and digital download. It includes acoustic versions of four tracks from Talking Dreams, as well as one exclusive track, "Terminal."

Reception 
Tina Roumelioti of Buzznet gave the EP a positive review, saying, "My only wish is that this album were longer, but good things come in small packages. Take a moment out of your day to pick up Acoustic Dreams, lie on your bedroom floor with a pair of headphones and start dreaming."

Matt Collar of AllMusic gave a  brief, indifferent review, noting, "...Acoustic Dreams, finds the California-based pop/rock outfit taking several tracks from its 2013 full-length album, Talking Dreams, and reworking them in an acoustic style. Featured here are such Echosmith fan favorites as "Let's Love," "Cool Kids," "Tell Her You Love Her," and "Talking Dreams." Also included is one new, never-before-released cut, "Terminal.""

Music blog It's All Dead, in a review of the album's vinyl LP release, noted, "Overall, Acoustic Dreams is a great collection of songs, but the label did the band no favors with the release’s lack of extras. Regardless, it’s a fun release for fans of the band..."

Format availability 
While given a standard wide release on vinyl LP and digital download, the CD version was only available for purchase on Warped Tour 2014.

Track listing 
All tracks were written by Jeffery David and Echosmith, except where noted.

Personnel

Echosmith 
 Sydney Sierota – Lead vocals, guitar
 Noah Sierota –  Bass guitar, vocals
 Jamie Sierota – Lead guitar, vocals
 Graham Sieorta – Drums

Additional musicians 
 John Catchings - Cello

Charts

References 

2014 EPs
Echosmith EPs